Lactate dehydrogenase B is a protein that in humans is encoded by the LDHB gene.

Function

This gene encodes the B subunit of lactate dehydrogenase enzyme, which catalyzes the interconversion of pyruvate and lactate with concomitant interconversion of NADH and NAD+ in a post-glycolysis process. Alternatively spliced transcript variants have been found for this gene. Recent studies have shown that a C-terminally extended isoform is produced by use of an alternative in-frame translation termination codon via a stop codon readthrough mechanism, and that this isoform is localized in the peroxisomes. Mutations in this gene are associated with lactate dehydrogenase B deficiency. Pseudogenes have been identified on chromosomes X, 5 and 13.

References

Further reading